The Basilica of Jesus de Medinaceli or the full name in Spanish: Basílica de Nuestro Padre Jesús de Medinaceli is a Roman Catholic church, specifically a basilica, located in central Madrid.

History
The church was consecrated in 1930. It was built around a statue of Padre Jesús Nazareno (Father Jesus of Nazareth), which was originally sculpted in 17th century Seville, and had been sent to a Spanish fortress in Morocco. There it was captured by the locals, and ransomed from the Moors by the Trinitarian monks, and housed in the Convent of the Trinitarios Descalzos (Barefoot Trinitarians). The icon created great devotion, and in 1689, the Duke of Medinaceli erected a chapel for the statue. In 1710, a lay fraternity was founded called the Congregation of Slaves of Jesús Nazareno. In 1890, when the convent of the Capuchins was being dismantled, the mother of the Duke of Mendinaceli, Doña Casilda Salabert y Arteaga, decided to erect a church. From then, the fraternity takes the title of "Cristo de Medinaceli". In 1928, the group was elevated to a primary archconfraternity by the Pope Pius XI. The image almost did not survive the Spanish Civil War, and the survival of the icon, despite its difficulties, has augmented its veneration.

See also
Catholic Church in Spain
List of oldest church buildings

References

External links
Church Website.

Roman Catholic churches in Madrid
Roman Catholic churches completed in 1930
20th-century Roman Catholic church buildings in Spain
Buildings and structures in Cortes neighborhood, Madrid